Jonathan Alexander Ramírez Silva (born December 18, 1990) is a Uruguayan football player, who plays as a forward for Atenas.

Career
Ramírez started his professional career playing for Tacuarembó in 2008. In July 2010, he joined Montevideo based River Plate, where he played the 2010–11 Uruguayan Primera División season and the 2010 Copa Sudamericana.

In August 2011, Ramírez joined Vélez Sársfield of the Argentine Primera División, that bought 50% of his transfer rights on an undisclosed fee.
In July 2012 he was loaned to Nacional.

References

External links
 Jonathan Ramírez – Argentine Primera statistics at Fútbol XXI 
 
 
 

1990 births
Living people
People from Tacuarembó Department
Association football forwards
Uruguayan footballers
Uruguayan expatriate footballers
Tacuarembó F.C. players
Club Atlético River Plate (Montevideo) players
Club Atlético Vélez Sarsfield footballers
Club Nacional de Football players
Sporting Cristal footballers
C.A. Cerro players
El Tanque Sisley players
C.D. Sonsonate footballers
Atenas de San Carlos players
Uruguayan Primera División players
Argentine Primera División players
Peruvian Primera División players
Uruguayan expatriate sportspeople in Argentina
Uruguayan expatriate sportspeople in Peru
Uruguayan expatriate sportspeople in El Salvador
Expatriate footballers in Argentina
Expatriate footballers in Peru
Expatriate footballers in El Salvador